Marina Erakovic and Arantxa Parra Santonja were the defending champions, but chose not to participate this year.
Asia Muhammad and Laura Siegemund won the title, defeating Jelena Janković and Anastasia Pavlyuchenkova in the final, 6–3, 7–5.

Seeds

Draw

References
 Main Draw

Topshelf Openandnbsp;- Doubles
2015 Women's Doubles